Samuel Theodore Liccardo (born April 16, 1970) is an American attorney and politician from California and former mayor of San José, California, a position he held from 2015 to 2023. A member of the Democratic Party, Liccardo was elected mayor in November 2014. He was reelected in 2018 with 75.8% of the vote. As the leader of the California Big City Mayors Coalition, Liccardo has advocated on statewide issues including homelessness and COVID-19 response.

Early life and education
One of five children to Salvador and Laura (née Aceves) Liccardo, Sam Liccardo grew up in Saratoga, California and graduated from Bellarmine College Preparatory in 1987. Liccardo received a bachelor's degree in government from Georgetown University, where he graduated magna cum laude and Phi Beta Kappa. He later earned his Juris Doctor and Master of Public Policy at Harvard Law School and Harvard Kennedy School. Prior to his election to public office in 2006 he served as a criminal prosecutor in the Santa Clara County District Attorney's office.

San José City Councilman 
In 2006, Liccardo ran for San Jose's District 3 Council seat. After placing first in an eight-candidate June primary with 43% percent of the vote, Liccardo went on to place first in the November runoff election, this time with 61.3%. In June 2010, he won his reelection to the City Council with 80.16% of the primary vote.

As councilman, Liccardo pushed for more affordable housing, championing an inclusionary zoning ordinance in 2008 that required developers to either build 15% of their units in any project to be affordable and rent-restricted, or to pay fees to finance affordable housing construction elsewhere. The statewide homebuilding industry vocally opposed the measure in part because it would make San Jose the largest US city with a citywide inclusionary requirement, and sued after its passage; subsequent litigation prevented its implementation until the California Supreme Court eventually sided with the City of San Jose in 2015. Liccardo also advocated for more high-rise housing in San José's downtown, including the construction of the $135 million, 23-story high rise at One South Market.

Mayor of San Jose

2014 election
In 2014, Liccardo ran for Mayor of San Jose to succeed termed-out Mayor Chuck Reed. He placed second to County Supervisor Dave Cortese in a five-candidate June primary with 25.7% of the vote, but placed first in the November runoff with 50.8% of the vote. The contentious run-off election focused on the City's chronic budgetary challenges, as well as Liccardo's support for pension reforms led by Mayor Reed that had City employee unions and their allies heavily supporting Cortese. Liccardo's financial support emanated primarily from the tech business community, but he also had support of several environmental organizations.

Pension reform

Prior to becoming mayor, Liccardo served on a City Council that saw retiree pension and health care contributions quadruple in about a decade, due to prior Council approvals of retroactive benefit increases, poor market returns, and rapidly rising unfunded liabilities in those accounts. Ballooning retirement contributions squeezed out other budgetary priorities, resulting in steep cuts in services and pay reductions, cutting the payroll by more than one thousand employees, making San Jose the major U.S. city with the most thinly-staffed city hall, and 49th out of the largest 50 U.S. cities in police staffing.

In his first year in office, he helped guide negotiations on an agreement with all 11 of city's employee unions that closed the retiree healthcare plan to new employees, and which could save the city $3 billion in employee retirement costs over the course of three decades. In the 2016 elections, voters approved the agreement by passing Measure F with more than 61% of the vote. This measure supplanted a more contentious pension reform plan, which has faced a series of legal challenges since its 2012 passage.  By 2022, San Jose's budget director reported that pension and retiree healthcare obligations had begun declining, enabling projections for balanced budgets for the following five years.

Transportation

As Mayor, Liccardo has pushed for transit, cycling, and other alternatives to the automobile in San Jose, a city that grew rapidly in an auto-dominated, suburban model in the 1950s and 60s.  Both during his time as City Councilmember and mayor, Liccardo served as a board member of the Valley Transportation Authority (VTA) (which he chaired twice) and Metropolitan Transportation Commission (MTC), advocating for the creation of a bikeshare program, expansion of Bay Area Rapid Transit (BART) to San Jose, and for the launch of the region's first bus-rapid-transit line, all of which began operations during his mayoral tenure. Liccardo was a leading advocate and fundraiser for several ballot measures to fund transit improvements that most notably included funding for the extension of BART to Downtown San Jose, most recently for the $6.3 billion VTA Measure B in 2016, and Regional Measure 3 in 2018. Measure B's passage by more than 70% of the voters did not settle the matter, as lawsuits and controversy ensued from some who opposed the tax as well as specific projects in the measure, but the lawsuit has since been resolved.

Liccardo was also instrumental in forging a consensus among Bay Area regional leaders to support putting Measure RR on the ballot, the passage of which in November 2020 will help preserve and expand Caltrain transit service, connecting San Jose and Santa Clara County with San Francisco. Liccardo has been a strong advocate of bringing High Speed Rail to Silicon Valley and the Bay Area, and has worked to secure regional dollars to pay for a share of that construction of that line, which has already commenced in the segment running through California's Central Valley. Liccardo has also urged more innovative approaches to supplant the region's plodding, poorly performing light rail, such as autonomous, electric bus rapid-transit.

As a cyclist, Liccardo long advocated for physically separated bike lanes, and under his tenure, a "Better Bikeways" network of bike lanes separated from vehicular traffic by buffers and low-cost bollards has emerged throughout the Downtown, and increasingly in surrounding neighborhoods.

"Smart City Vision"

In March 2016, Liccardo unveiled a "Smart City Vision", with the expressed goal to make San José the "most innovative city in America by 2020." Liccardo hired Shireen Santosham to be his Chief Innovation Officer and lead the newly created Mayor's Office of Technology and Innovation (MOTI). The Smart City Vision received unanimous approval from the City Council in March, and in June 2016 the city created an Office of Civic Innovation to meet its goals. Since then, Liccardo formed a partnership with Facebook to deploy the company's wireless, high-speed internet technology called "Terragraph" in downtown San José, and the City of San José launched a project to bring free wireless internet to two schools in San José's East Side Union High School District.

In 2019, Liccardo launched the San José Digital Inclusion Fund, a $24 million initiative to bridge the digital divide in San Jose by extending broadband, distributing devices, and improving digital skills among tens of thousands of low-income families. The pandemic accelerated the City's efforts, resulting in distribution of free hotspots to 15,800 children by October 2020, with another 50,000 residents receiving broadband service through the City's Wi-Fi partnership with the East Side Union High School District.  After Council approved funding in late 2020, Liccardo announced the City's progress of reaching 100,000 residents, along with plan to connect 300,000 East San Jose residents—the population of a city the size of Pittsburgh or St. Louis—by full build-out in 2022.

Other partnerships emerged through the City's innovation work under Liccardo's lead. For example, San José became the first city to launch a "Cash for Trash" program, in partnership with Mastercard, to enable homeless residents to earn and safely keep money in exchange for cleaning the city's streets, neighborhoods, and creeks. Mastercard's CityKey technology enabled unhoused to safely keep cash, while preventing purchases in such businesses as liquor stores, and could be used to facilitate the provision of health and other services.

Airbnb and San Jose partnered on several housing-related initiatives that leveraged innovative uses of the AirBnB platform in San José as a pilot city. The "Open Homes" program help victims of natural disaster find emergency housing with an AirBnB host without cost, and since its launch in San José, now serves cities globally.  Another San Jose and AirBnB partnership with the nonprofit Bill Wilson Center and San José State University provides AirBnB sponsor homes for unhoused college students for extended durations.

Recognizing San Jose's success in its digital inclusion efforts, as well as their use of data, analytics, and technology in such initiatives as improving emergency medical response, identifying high-risk traffic crash corridors, and responding to vulnerable residents during the pandemic, Government Technology ranked San José No. 1 among large U.S. cities in its Digital Cities Survey in 2020.

In 2022, Liccardo appointed Clay Garner to lead the Mayor's Office of Technology and Innovation.

Housing crisis

Throughout Liccardo's tenure, many San Jose residents suffered under very high rent burdens attributable in part to California's housing shortage. To boost housing supply, Liccardo led efforts to reduce fees on construction of granny units and Downtown high-rises, increase housing densities—including such innovative approaches such as "coliving—near transit, and streamline approvals of "backyard homes," also known as alternate dwelling units.

Liccardo has also pushed for more public resources for affordable housing, building on his work on inclusionary housing as a councilmember.  In 2018, he led a coalition of affordable housing advocates to propose Measure V, a $450 million housing bond measure which secured 64% of the vote, but still narrowly failed due to California's 2/3 threshold for passage of bond measures. Liccardo vowed to push to find a successful alternative, and in 2019, he partnered with SiliconValley@Home and other affordable housing organizations to put Measure E—a supplemental transfer tax on properties sold for $2 million or more—on the March 2020 ballot. The measure passed with 53% support, and will generate up to an estimated $70 million annually for affordable housing and homeless response.

San Jose's efforts to house its 6,000 homeless residents have been hindered by the extremely high costs of housing construction in the region. In response, Liccardo pushed to find more innovative, cost-effective ways to house the homeless, including the use of prefabricated and modular construction, construction of "tiny homes," and the rehabilitation of deteriorating motels. With the non-profit Destination:Home, he also pushed to find collaborative approaches with landlords to take more homeless veterans as tenants; on Veteran's Day in 2015, he and Santa Clara County Supervisor Dave Cortese launched the "All the Way Home" campaign with Destination:Home. One year after launching the program, the group announced it had found homes for more than 500 homeless veterans, and had housed 1,940 by 2020.

In late 2017, Liccardo called for the construction of 25,000 new housing units in San Jose, including 10,000 affordable units. Liccardo since publicly admitted that the lack of housing affordability and homelessness have persisted as crises for which he had made insufficient progress, and is very unlikely to reach those goals, particularly as a severe recession, pandemic, the failure of Measure V, and high construction costs have inhibited progress.

2017 Coyote Creek flood

On February 21–22, 2017, after one month of heavy rainfall, Anderson Dam overspilled, causing the Coyote Creek flooded in central San Jose, displacing 14,000 people. Residents complained that the city failed to uphold its duty to protect and warn its citizens. Liccardo and other city officials accepted responsibility for failures to warn residents in their emergency response, but also pointed to very inaccurate flood projections and warnings from the regional agency responsible for flood protection in the County, the Santa Clara Valley Water District.

Environment and energy

Liccardo's environmental initiatives have focused on preserving open space, halting sprawling development, launching a community choice energy program, and reducing GhG emissions in energy consumption, building design, and transportation.  In 2015, Liccardo publicly expressed a desire to halt plans for large-scale development in Coyote Valley—an environmentally sensitive, little-developed area south of San Jose—instead preserving it as wildlife habitat and open space for future generations. Working with the Peninsula Open Space Trust and the Open Space Authority, a plan was assembled to purchase large tracts of land to preserve the Valley, using philanthropic and public sources.  In 2018, Liccardo proposed and led Measure T, a bond measure that would enable the use of $50 million for purchase of open space to risks of flooding and wildfires, targeting Coyote Valley. After overwhelming support of Measure T from the electorate the City worked with POST and OSA to consummate a transaction for almost 1,000 acres of land, and the Council unanimously approved it.

In 2018, the development company Ponderosa Homes sought to build approximately 1,000 single-family luxury homes in the mostly undeveloped Evergreen foothills of San Jose, in contravention of the city's General Plan.   They spent $6 million to urge voters to approve Measure B what they characterized as the "Evergreen Senior Homes Initiative." Liccardo led a coalition of environmental organizations, neighborhood leaders, and community groups to defeat Measure B despite being badly outspent. Liccardo and the group further proposed and won voter approval for another initiative, Measure C, which sharply limits development in the hillsides and rural edges of the city, to avoid future attempts by developers to bypass the General Plan with heavily funded ballot measures.

Under Liccardo's tenure, San Jose followed an aggressive agenda to decarbonize its grid and to reduce greenhouse gas emissions.  In May 2017, Liccardo urged, and the San Jose City Council unanimously agreed to launch a Community Choice Energy program, becoming the largest city in the country to do so. Mayor Liccardo advocated for the adoption of a Community Choice Energy program as a way to take action against climate change while President Trump's administration turned back to fossil fuels. San Jose Clean Energy, as the new utility is called, provides nearly every San Jose resident and business with electricity generated 92% from carbon-free sources, such as solar and hydroelectric. Two years later, San Jose became the largest U.S. city to adopt mandates of all-electric new construction for all new buildings, with a few limited exceptions.

Economic development
During Liccardo's tenure prior to the pandemic, San Jose underwent an unprecedented expansion of tech employers, with announcements of new campuses from major companies such as Amazon, Apple, Google, Micron, Microsoft, NetApp, Verizon, and Western Digital, as well as fast-growing tech companies, such as 
Okta, Roku, Splunk, and Supermicro. San Jose also saw major expansions from its headquartered companies, such as Adobe, Broadcom, and Zoom.  
Liccardo's relationship with technology companies, and particularly his fundraising from tech companies for philanthropic and political purposes, became a topic of ongoing media scrutiny.

Although Liccardo aggressively sought to lure and grow tech in San Jose, he adamantly refused to offer any public subsidies—through incentives, tax breaks, or fee reductions—for that purpose, insisting that tech leaders placed far greater emphasis on access to talent and infrastructure, and that any public expenditure would be wasted. After Amazon generated extensive national news coverage for its "beauty contest" of cites for its "HQ2" campus, Liccardo wrote an op-ed in the Wall Street Journal asserting that San Jose would not offer any public subsidies or tax breaks—and urging other cities to follow suit.

The planned Google development in San Jose's Downtown West—comprising more than six million square feet of office space, retail, restaurants, and thousands of apartments in an urban village around the Downtown transit center, became a major focus during Liccardo's tenure. For several years before the 2017 announcement, Liccardo had repeatedly sought to encourage Google to consider a Downtown campus, and in late 2016, met with executives to discuss plans for an expansive project that would comprise twice the size of Apple's nearby global headquarters.

Although the project appeared popular with most San Jose residents, based on polling showing more than 70% support for the development, a growing tech backlash, or "techlash" emerged from some progressive and union-affiliated groups over the impact of tech's growth on rising housing costs and displacement. They protested over the impacts of Google's growth on homelessness and already-high housing costs, and criticized Liccardo for his private meetings with Google executives for several months prior to the June 2017 public announcement of the deal, as well as his signing of a "nondisclosure agreement" during the time in which the company sought to avoid the price-inflating effect of public knowledge of Google's intentions while it was purchasing dozens of privately owned parcels in the Downtown area. Liccardo countered that no negotiation with Google over the public land purchase transpired until after the public announcement, and that dozens of public meetings transpired to ensure full scrutiny of the project before Council approval. Liccardo was also criticized for failing to disclose a Downtown condominium that his wife owned prior to their 2013 marriage until 2018—a disclosure that occurred prior to the Council's approval of the Google deal, but after negotiations had commenced.  Liccardo apologized for failing to sooner include his wife's property in his annual public financial disclosures, but the City Attorney concluded that there was no legal conflict of interest because the condo was not sufficiently proximate to the project. Liccardo also owns his home Downtown, which has been publicly disclosed since 2008.

 Through negotiations with the City,  
Google ultimately agreed to purchase the public land at an elevated price, and through a public Memorandum of Understanding, Google committed to build thousands of apartments and condos, and that 25% would be rent-restricted and affordable. Google further agreed to pay millions in "commercial impact" fees for affordable housing, and when combined with other amenities and community benefits, agreed to more than $1 billion in public commitments. Google made a separate public commitment of a $1 billion revolving fund to finance affordable housing in the San Jose metro area. In May 2021, the Council unanimously approved the project.

Since the pandemic, San Jose suffered severe job losses, which disproportionately impacted low- and modest- income residents in East San Jose.  In response, Liccardo partnered with several organizations, including Destination:Home, Cisco Systems, and the County of Santa Clara to launch the Silicon Valley Strong Fund to support struggling families and small businesses.  Within a month, the group raised more than $20 million of private donations  which the City matched with federal Cares Act dollars as well to provide local direct relief for struggling families. Nonetheless, the pandemic resulted in the loss of many small businesses.  Liccardo's efforts to mitigate those devastating losses have primarily focused on "San Jose Al Fresco," an initiative to enable restaurants, retailers, and service businesses to operate safely outdoors, the facilitation of small business grants and loans through a one-stop website (SiliconValleyStrong.org), and a buy-local campaign.

2018 election

Liccardo was elected to a second term of office on June 5, 2018, winning support of 76% of the voters.

Personal life
Sam Liccardo married Jessica Garcia-Kohl in 2013. He was named for his paternal grandfather, who owned and operated a neighborhood grocery store in downtown San Jose, the Notre Dame Market. Liccardo is of Californio ancestry, tracing his ancestors to the early Mexican settlers of the Bay Area, and is also of Sicilian and Irish descent.

Liccardo made an appearance in Episode 1 of Season 6 of the HBO series Silicon Valley.

In January 2019 Liccardo was severely injured in a bicycle accident. He was admitted to Regional Medical Center with a broken Vertebrae and sternum.

See also
 List of mayors of the 50 largest cities in the United States

References

External links

1970 births
21st-century American politicians
American people of Irish descent
American people of Italian descent
American politicians of Mexican descent
California Democrats
Californios
Georgetown University alumni
Harvard Law School alumni
Harvard Kennedy School alumni
Living people
Mayors of San Jose, California
People from Saratoga, California
San Jose City Council members
Smart cities